Bridget K. Mutuma is a researcher in chemistry and material sciences at Nairobi University in Kenya.  She focuses on developing nanomaterials associated with sensors. She is a Fellow of the African Academy of Sciences.

References

External links

Year of birth missing (living people)
Living people
Fellows of the African Academy of Sciences
Academic staff of Kirinyaga University
Nanotechnologists
University of the Witwatersrand alumni
21st-century Kenyan women scientists
21st-century Kenyan scientists